Bryan Borges Mascarenhas (born 3 August 1996), simply known as Bryan, is a Brazilian footballer who plays for Náutico. Mainly an attacking midfielder, he can also play as a right back.

Career statistics

Club

Notes

Honours
Náutico
 Campeonato Pernambucano: 2018,2021,2022

References

External links
 

1996 births
Living people
Brazilian footballers
Association football defenders
Association football midfielders
Campeonato Brasileiro Série C players
Esporte Clube Juventude players
Associação Chapecoense de Futebol players
Clube Náutico Capibaribe players
Sportspeople from Salvador, Bahia